The 68HC05 (HC05 in short) is a broad family of 8-bit microcontrollers from Freescale Semiconductor (formerly Motorola Semiconductor).

Like all Motorola processors that share lineage from the 6800, they use the von Neumann architecture as well as memory-mapped I/O.  This family has five CPU registers that are not part of the memory: an 8-bit accumulator A, an 8-bit index register X, an 8-bit stack pointer SP with two most significant bits hardwired to 1, a 13-bit program counter PC, and an 8-bit condition code register CCR.

Among the HC05's there are several processor families, each targeted to different embedded applications.

The 68HC05 family broke ground with the introduction of the EEPROM-based MC68HC805C4 and MC68HC805B6 variants in the late 1980s. Using a serial bootloader, they could be programmed in-circuit with simple software running on a PC and a low current 19 V supply (no programmer required).

The HC05 series is now considered legacy and is replaced by the HC(S)08 MCU series.

Nomenclature

External links 
 68HC05 and 6805 family datasheets - archive.org
 Archives of old 68HC05 and 68HC705 manuals
 Digital Core Design 68HC05 - HDL IP Core
 MC68HC805B6 (6k EEPROM program memory) Programmer

Freescale Semiconductor microcontrollers
Motorola microcontrollers